The Viktor Lenac Shipyard ( or Shipyard Viktor Lenac d.d. (JSC)) is situated on the northern Croatian Adriatic coast, 3 km from the largest Croatian port It was founded in 1896, and was among the first in the world to deal with ship lengthenings. It is quoted on the Zagreb Stock Exchange with ticker VLEN-R-B.

Today it has three floating dry docks, one accommodating vessels up to 160,000 dwt, more than 1,000 metres of berthing space, a large offshore construction site and it specializes in ship conversions and gas platform construction.

History 
In 1896 a ship repair facility for the merchant, naval and fishing vessel fleets of the Austro-Hungarian Empire was founded in Rijeka, the largest Adriatic port, under the name Lazarus. After the end of the Second World War, in 1948, the yard was nationalised and renamed Viktor Lenac, after a communist who worked at the shipyard and was honoured by it.

In the late 1960s the shipyard was moved 3 kilometres to the south to its present location at Martinšćica Bay (Kostrena), which has an adequate water depth to accommodate vessels with deep draughts. The shipyard purchased two floating drydocks and cranes and put them in the bay. After this move, the yard rapidly developed its repair, conversion, and offshore capabilities. After a managerial reorganization in 1990, the shipyard was registered as a joint-stock company in 1993 and is today the only privately owned major shipyard in Croatia.

After being rescued several times by government guarantees, the company filed for bankruptcy in November 2003 with debts of €102 million, after the government refused to guarantee a loan of US$12 million. The bankruptcy process was completed in 2008 and Tankerska plovidba Co., Croatia's largest shipping company, became the largest shareholder, followed by the Uljanik Shipyard, Croatia's major builder of car carriers and dredgers.

In 2009 Floating Dock No. 11, that can accommodate vessels up to Suezmax size, was put into full operation after refurbishment.

In 2011, the shipyard won a competitive bidding process for a 60-day maintenance program on the American ship USS Mount Whitney, during which the shipyard was visited by the United States Ambassador to Croatia, and Frank Pandolfe, commander, U.S. 6th Fleet. The visit was said to have served to strengthen the bonds between the two countries.

Viktor Lenac has successfully completed extensive ship repair and dry-docking of US Navy's 6th Fleet flagship USS Mount Whitney (LCC 20). This highly complex project marked the year as one of the most important ship repair projects. It occupied a large part of the shipyard resources most of 2015. The works commenced in January 2015 and were completed in August 2015. They included complete overhaul and docking of the ship, class surveys, renovation of accommodations and galleys, shell plating and deckhouse steel renewal. Especially interesting was the modification of the existing vessel's electrical power supply system and the installation of new generators, switch boards and control mechanisms, and refurbishment of the fuel system, reverse osmosis system, black and gray discharge water system, fire alarm and similar. UHP water blasting of hull, Ballast tanks blasting with steel shots and application of full coating system, cleaning and gas freeing of all fuel tanks, modification of existing spaces into the new auxiliary engine room including installation of 3 new CAT generators, switch boards and control room was carried out. This is the second time that Viktor Lenac has been awarded a USS Mount Whitney contract. In 2011 the ship underwent extensive docking and class surveys.

Notable conversions 

 The Helix Producer 1 was reconfigured as a FPSO vessel and converted between 2006 and 2008 at the Viktor Lenac Shipyard.
 Sampson, the crane and pipelay vessel, was converted in Lenac in 2012.
 Atlantic Navigator, the Stern Trawler, was extended and converted in Lenac in 2008.

Notable ship repairs 

 Saipem's semisubmersible rig Scarabeo 4 was maintained and repaired in Viktor Lenac in 2009.
 USS Mount Whitney, the amphibious command ship was repaired in 2011 and again in 2015 at the Viktor Lenac Shipyard
 Greek shipowner Aristotle Onassis's luxury yacht Christina O reconstruction in 2001

References

External links 
 trusted docks, Viktor Lenac Shipyard on trusteddocks.com

Shipyards of Europe
Shipbuilding companies of Croatia
Manufacturing companies established in 1896
Croatian brands
1896 establishments in Austria-Hungary
Companies based in Rijeka